Club Atlético Green Cross is a football club based in Manta, Ecuador and founded on January 12, 1961. In 1991 the team won the title in the Serie B E1.

Achievements

National
Campeonato Ecuatoriano de Fútbol Serie B
Winner (1): 1991 E1

References

Green Cross, Club Atletico
Green Cross, Club Atletico
1961 establishments in Ecuador